The Hoosier North Athletic Conference is an IHSAA-sanctioned conference in northwestern Indiana, that began in 2015. The conference contains eight schools in six counties (Cass, Fulton, Marshall, Pulaski, St. Joseph, and Starke), but may expand to include more schools in the future.

History
2015: The Hoosier North Athletic Conference (HNAC) was formed by schools from the Northern State Conference (Culver, Knox, LaVille, and Triton), Midwest Conference (Caston, Pioneer, West Central, and Winamac), and then independent North Judson-San Pierre. The HNAC was formed in an effort to shorten travel distances and increase competition among member schools. The exodus of the 4 Northern State Conference teams caused that conference to fold, and forced other teams from Bremen,  Jimtown, John Glenn, and New Prairie to join the Northern Indiana Conference.
2017: The West Central school board approved a measure to leave the Hoosier North Athletic Conference and re-join the Midwest conference, a move that, in accordance with HNAC bylaws, will be completed by the end of the 2018–19 school year.

Members

Former Members

 Played concurrently in HNAC and MWC 2018–19.

Membership timeline

Conference Champions

Football

Boys Basketball

Pioneer and Winamac were co-champions in 2016.

Girls Basketball

State Championships

Pioneer (6)

2017 Football (1A)
2018 Softball (1A)
2018 Football (1A)
2020 Volleyball (1A)
2021 Girls' Basketball (1A)
2021 Softball (2A)

North Judson (1)

2018 Volleyball (2A)

Math Contest
The Conference hosts a math tournament every school year at different schools within the conference. The 2018 tournament will be held at Knox.

References

Indiana high school athletic conferences
High school sports conferences and leagues in the United States